The Atmospheric Remote-sensing Infrared Exoplanet Large-survey (ARIEL) is a space telescope and the fourth medium-class mission of the European Space Agency's Cosmic Vision programme. The mission is aimed at observing at least 1000 known exoplanets using the transit method, studying and characterising the planets' chemical composition and thermal structures. Compared to the James Webb Space Telescope, ARIEL will have more observing time available for planet characterisation but a much smaller telescope and it will be launched almost a decade later. ARIEL is expected to be launched in 2029 aboard an Arianespace Ariane 6 together with the Comet Interceptor.

Mission 
ARIEL will observe 1000 planets orbiting distant stars and make the first large-scale survey of the chemistry of exoplanet atmospheres. The objective is to answer fundamental questions about how planetary systems form and evolve. A spectrometer will spread the light into a spectrum ("rainbow") and determine the chemical fingerprints of gases in the planets' atmospheres. This will enable scientists to understand how the chemistry of a planet links to the environment in which it forms, and how its formation and evolution are affected by its parent star. ARIEL will study a diverse population of exoplanets in a wide variety of environments, but it will focus on warm and hot planets in orbits close to their star.

The ARIEL mission is being developed by a consortium of various institutions from eleven member states of the European Space Agency (ESA), and international contributors from four countries. The project is led by principal investigator Giovanna Tinetti of the University College London, who had previously led the unsuccessful Exoplanet Characterisation Observatory (EcHO) proposal for the M3 Cosmic Vision launch slot. Operations of the mission and the spacecraft will be handled jointly by ESA and the consortium behind the mission's development, through a coordinated Instrument Operations and Science Data Centre (IOSDC). A Mission Operations Centre (MOC) will be set up at the European Space Operations Centre (ESOC) in Darmstadt, Germany, while a concurrent ARIEL Science Operations Centre (SOC) will be set up at the European Space Astronomy Centre (ESAC) near Madrid, Spain. The MOC will be responsible for the spacecraft itself, while the SOC will be responsible for archiving mission data and scientific data downlinked from the spacecraft. The IOSDC will help develop results from the mission based on data received by the SOC.

In August 2017, NASA conditionally selected Contribution to ARIEL Spectroscopy of Exoplanets (CASE) as a Partner Mission of Opportunity, pending the result of ESA's Cosmic Vision selection. Under the proposal NASA provides two fine guidance sensors for the ARIEL spacecraft in return for the participation of U.S. scientists in the mission. CASE was officially selected in November 2019, with JPL astrophysicist Mark Swain as principal investigator.

On December 7, 2021, ESA announced that the €200 million contract to build ARIEL had been awarded to Airbus Defence and Space.

Spacecraft 
The design of the ARIEL spacecraft is based on that intended for the Exoplanet Characterisation Observatory (EChO) mission, and has heritage from the thermal design of Planck. The body of the spacecraft is split into two distinct modules known as the Service Module (SVM) and the Payload Module (PLM). The SVM is shaped as a 'sandwich' structure, consisting of three aluminium V-Grooves and three pairs of low conductivity fibreglass bipod struts supporting the PLM. A basic horizontal telescope configuration is used for the PLM itself, housing all of the spacecraft's scientific instruments and its oval  primary mirror.

Telescope 
The ARIEL telescope's assembly is an off-axis Cassegrain telescope followed by a third parabolic mirror to recollimate the beam. The telescope uses an oval  primary mirror; the imaging quality of the system is limited by diffraction for wavelengths longer than about 3 µm, and its focal ratio (f) is 13.4. The system will acquire images in the visible and near-infrared spectrum.

Launch and trajectory 
The ARIEL spacecraft is expected to be launched in 2029 by Arianespace's Ariane 62 launch vehicle (currently in development) together with the Comet Interceptor. It will be launched from the Centre Spatial Guyanais (CSG) in Kourou, French Guiana, from the "Ensemble de lancement Ariane" ELA-4 (Ariane Launch Area-4) being purpose-built for future Ariane 6 launches.

See also 

 CHEOPS and PLATO – Cosmic Vision exoplanetology missions
 Fast Infrared Exoplanet Spectroscopy Survey Explorer (FINESSE) – was a mission proposal (cancelled) to NASA equivalent to ARIEL
 Comet Interceptor – launching on the same launch vehicle
 List of space telescopes

Notes

References

External links 
 ARIEL  official website
 ARIEL at the European Space Agency

2029 in spaceflight
Cosmic Vision
Exoplanet search projects
European Space Agency space probes
Space telescopes
Proposed space probes